Out of Nowhere may refer to:

Film and TV
Out of Nowhere (2000 film), a documentary by Fintan Connolly

Music
Out of Nowhere (Salonen), classical composition and album by Esa-Pekka Salonen
Out of Nowhere (Australian band)

Albums
Out of Nowhere (Chet Baker album)
Out of Nowhere (James Carter album)
Out of Nowhere (Sonny Criss album)
Out of Nowhere (Don Ellis album)
Out of Nowhere (Harold Fethe album)
Out of Nowhere (Lee Konitz and Paul Bley album)
Out of Nowhere (Vinnie Moore album)
Out Of Nowhere (Jimi Tenor album), 2000 solo album by Jimi Tenor
Out of Nowhere (Borghesia album), by Borghesia

Songs
"Out of Nowhere" (Johnny Green song)
"Out of Nowhere" (Gloria Estefan song)
"Out of Nowhere", a song by Nikki Yanofsky on her 2014 album Little Secret